The Fayette County Career and Technical Institute, located near  Uniontown, Pennsylvania is a local vocational technical school for students enrolled in one of four school districts in the county.

Sending school districts and high schools
The following school districts and their respective high schools attend FCCTI:

Program areas
Currently, there are 18 program areas at FCCTI. They Include
 Advanced Manufacturing Adademy
 Agriculture
 Auto Body
 Auto Mechanics
 Barbershop
 Building Construction
 Cosmeotology
 Culinary Arts
 Diesel Mechanics
 Electrical Construction
 Graphic Arts
 Health Occupations
 Heating, Ventilation and Air Conditioning (HVAC)
 Information Technology
 Machine Production Technology
 Masonry
 Welding

Organizations
The following organizations are available to the high school students:
 Future Farmers of America (FFA)
 Health Occupations Students of America (HOSA)
 National Technical Honor Society
 Pennsylvania Home Builders Association
 SkillsUSA
 Student Council
 Students Against Destructive Decisions (SADD)

References

External links
Official site

Vocational education in the United States
Schools in Fayette County, Pennsylvania
Educational institutions established in 1967